Teulisna ruptifascia is a moth in the family Erebidae. It was described by George Talbot in 1926. It is found on Borneo. The habitat consists of upper montane forests.

References

Moths described in 1926
ruptifascia